Tiloa is a town in Niger. On February 23, 2015, 15 soldiers of the Niger Armed Forces were killed outside the town by terrorists.

References

Populated places in Niger